Merulempista wolschrijni is a species of snout moth. It is found in the Netherlands, where it is an introduced species.

The wingspan is 15 mm.

References

Moths described in 1997
Phycitini